The Prince Pierre Foundation (Fondation Prince Pierre de Monaco) was established by Prince Rainier III of Monaco in February 1966 to promote culture and the arts through the creation and the awarding of prizes. Prince Rainier III created the foundation in tribute to his father Pierre de Polignac, a great patron of the arts.

History
The Prince Pierre Foundation was established by Prince Rainier III of Monaco in February 1966.

Starting in 1988, the foundation was presided by Caroline, Princess of Hanover.

Prizes and awardees

Pincipality Prize
Joint award between the Prince Pierre Foundation and the Monaco Philosophical Meetings.

2019: Georges Didi-Huberman
2018: Jean-Luc Marion

Literary Prize
The Prince Pierre of Monaco Literary Prize, of 15,000 euros, which gives recognition to a French writer or any well-known author who writes in French.

Art Prize (PIAC)
The International Contemporary Art Prize (PIAC) is open to juried artists who submit three works of any artistic format as part of a contemporary art exhibition held in Monaco. Originally established in 1965, the competition has been organised by the Foundation since 1983. Prior to 2005 the Artistic Committee made an annual award of the Prince Rainier III Grand Prize of 15,000 euros and the Princess Grace Foundation prize, the Discovery Scholarship, of 12,000 euros to an artist under the age of 40. Since then the prize has been worth €40,000 to a single winner, of which €20,000 is to cover the cost of new work. In 2010 the format was changed to involve the Prize being awarded every three years

(PR) = Prince Rainier prize, (PG) = Princess Grace Foundation prize

{{columns-list|colwidth=30em|
2019: Arthur Jafa for Love Is The Message, The Message Is Death
 2013 Dora Garcia for The Deviant Majority (45th competition)
 2010 Guido van der Werve for Nummer Twaalf
 2009 Su-Mei Tse for Some Airing
 2008 Didier Marcel for Sans titre (labours)
 2007 Candice Breitz for Mothers and Fathers 2006 Saâdane Afif for Power Chords 2005 Carlos Caraicoa for Carta a los Censores 2004 Max Neumann (PR), Will Cotton (PG)
 2003 Pierre Edouard (PR), Bernardo Roig (PG)
 2002 Sergio Sanz (PR), Béatrice Paquali (PG)
 2001 Nicolas Alquin (PR), Joana Jorge Goncalves (PG)
 2000 Juan José Aquerreta (PR), Margherita Manzelli (PG)
 1999 Thomas Orthmann (PR), Orlando Mostyn-Owen (PG)
 1998 Stephen Conroy (PR), Xavier Nellens (PG)
 1997 Roberto Matta (PR), Lorenzo Cardi (PG)
 1996 Vincent Desiderio (PR), Ségolène Franc du Breil (PG)
 1995 Hugo Sbernini (PR), Alexandra Athanassiades (PG)
 1994 Motohiko Obara (PR), Alessandro Montalbano (PG)
 1993 Yuri Kuper (PR?), Didier Mahieu (PG)
 1992 Oswaldo Vigas (PR), Mauro Corda (PG)
 1991 Vincent Bioules (PR), Xavier Dambrine (PG)
 1990 Jean-Paul Chambas (PR), Benoît Luyckx (PG)
 1989 Barbara Goraczko (PR), Manuel Leonardi (PG)
 1988 Jean-François Duffau (PR), Christoff Debusschere (PG)
 1987 Jean-Paul Agosti (PR), Rémi Bourquin (PG)
 1986 Luis Alberto (PR), Belzere (PG)
 1985 Richard Boutin (PR), Tadeusz Brudzynski (PG)
 1984 Pancho Quilici (PR), Matthias Hollander (PG)
 1983 Jochen Schimmelpenning (PR)
}}

Discovery Scholarship
2019: Grégory Le Floch for In the forest of the hamlet of Hardt2018: Sébastien Ministru for Apprendre à lire2007: Carole Martinez for Le cœur cousuPrize for critical essay on contemporary art
2019: Anneka Lenssen for Abstraction of the Number?Music Composition Prize
The Prince Pierre of Monaco Music Composition Prize, of 15,000 euros, award to a contemporary music work created in the preceding year.

2019: Jukka Tiensuu for Abstraction of the Number?2007: Georges Aperghis for Wölfli-KantataCoup de cœur des Lycéens Prize
The high school "coup de coeur" prize was launched in 2007.

2019: Aurélie Razimbaud for A Life of Hot Stones2018: Emmanuelle Favier for Le courage qui faut aux rivières''

See also
 List of European art awards

References

External links
Official website

Visual arts awards
Foundations based in Monaco